Time in Mongolia is officially represented by the Mongolian Standard Time (UTC+08:00). However, the far western provinces of Khovd, Uvs and Bayan-Ölgii use UTC+07:00.

Daylight saving time
Mongolia used daylight saving time in 1983–1998, 2001–2006 and 2015–2016.

IANA time zone database
The IANA time zone database contains three zones for Mongolia in the file zone.tab.

See also 
 Historical time zones of China

References

External links
 http://www.statoids.com/tmn.html

See also